The Playford family has played a significant role in the South Australian and Australian political and social sphere since the early days of European settlement.

Thomas Playford senior, an ex-soldier who fought at the Battle of Waterloo, a fiery Baptist preacher who arrived in Adelaide c. 1844 and helped found a church called, simply, "The Christian Church".
Thomas Playford II served as Premier of South Australia from 1887 to 1889 and 1890 to 1892, as well as a Senator in the newly formed Commonwealth of Australia (a name he coined), including a stint as the Federal Minister for Defence.
Thomas Playford III was a well-known local farmer and Adelaide identity.
Thomas Playford IV was Premier of South Australia from 1938 to 1965; the longest serving elected national or regional leader in the British Empire/ Commonwealth of Nations.
Thomas Playford V is a Baptist minister who ran at the 2002 South Australian state election for the seat of Kavel under the banner of "Independent for Integrity in Parliament", polling 19%. He ran as a Family First candidate for the same seat at the 2006 election, polling 15% of the vote.

Notes

References

Australian people of English descent
Political families of Australia
Australian families
English families